Coast to Coast is a 1984 album (LP Vinyl) released by McDonald's All-American High School Jazz Band under the direction of Bob Curnow.  The group was formed in 1981 as a part of the McDonald's All-American High School Band program that had started back in the late 1960s to feature talented, up and coming high school musicians.

Background 
As part of the 1983-84 McDonald's All-American High School Band, the jazz band was formed (from within the larger group) to more specifically feature up and coming high school jazz musicians from all over the United States.  The Coast to Coast LP was part of the overall program Bob Curnow and the McDonald's Corporation helped to achieve in 1983/84 with these high school student musicians.  The LP stands out with the fact the group recorded with no overdubs at all and the solos going live to a 24 track board; this was all done in a 5-hour time span.   The level of student and performance is outstanding.  During the time in Las Vegas recording the LP the group also did a special appearance on the nationally televised Jerry Lewis MDA Labor Day Telethon.  This was part of the yearly national appearances the ensemble would do on tour.   Several of the student musicians on the LP have become very prominent names on the international music scene to include Greg Gisbert, Harry Allen, and Eric Miyashiro.

Reception 

"...out of those 105 musicians, 20 eventually become members of the All-American High School Jazz Band...(The LP) features the 1983-4 edition and it's quite impressive. The players certainly do not sound like teenagers and some of the soloists, particularly trumpeters John Bailey and Greg Gisbert stand out as musicians to watch in the future. The charts are particularly colorful..."

Cadence Magazine

Track listing

Recording sessions 
 Recorded: September 1984, RMS Recording Studio, Las Vegas, Nevada

Personnel

Musicians 
Conductor: Robert Curnow
Saxophones:  Terry Goss, Scott Ackerman, Harry Allen, Chris Conelius, Pete Giancola
Trumpets and flugelhorns: Barry Parr, John Bailey, Greg Gisbert, Mike Burnette, Doug James
Trombones: John DiLutis, Tom Riccobono, Jeff Knutson, Jeff Lindholm, Mark Rusch
Guitar: Hamp Brockman
Piano: Karen Mietz
Bass: Jeff Parker
Drums/Percussion: Joe Mansir
Drums/Percussion: Andy Wright

Production 
Recording engineer: Lou Carlo, Jr.
Mixing engineer: Tom Miller, Universal Studios, Chicago
Mastering: K-Disc, Hollywood, CA
Cover art: Stephanie Trusz
Photography: Richard Shay, Tom Kravitz
Liner Notes: Leonard Feather

References

1984 albums
Jazz albums by American artists
Big band albums
Mainstream jazz albums